This is a list of media and merchandise associated with The Flintstones.

UK VHS releases

VHS releases
Most of these titles are out of print. Original broadcast or release dates and episode titles (where applicable) are listed in parentheses.

 The Flintstone Comedy Show: 25th Anniversary Special (1980: "Mountain Frustration", "Potion Problem", "Camp-Out Mouse", "Clownfoot", "The Ghost Sitters", "Sands of the Saharastone"): Released October 1985
 The Flintstone Comedy Show 2: Curtain Call (1980: "Gold Fever", "Night on the Town", "Monster Madness", "Arcade Antics", "Follow That Dogosaurus", "Be Patient, Fred"): Released January 1986
 The Flintstones: Little Big League (1978): Released August 5, 1986
 The Flintstones: The First Episodes (1960: "The Flintstone Flyer", "Hot Lips Hannigan", "The Swimming Pool", "No Help Wanted"): Released August 20, 1987
 The Flintstone Comedy Show: Rocky's Raiders (1966): contains the episode "The Story of Rocky's Raiders": Released 1987
 The Jetsons Meet the Flintstones (1987): Released April 7, 1988
 A Flintstone Christmas (1977): Released October 1988
 Hanna-Barbera Personal Favorites: The Flintstones (1960–65: "The Split Personality", "The Blessed Event", "Ann-Margrock Presents", "The Stone-Finger Caper"): Released October 20, 1988
 The Flintstone Kids (1986–87): 12 episodes: Released November 10, 1988
 The Flintstone Kids: A "Just Say No" Special (1988): Released November 10, 1988
 The Flintstone Comedy Show: My Fair Freddy (1966): contains the episode "My Fair Freddie": Released 1988
 The Man Called Flintstone (1966): Released January 26, 1989
 The Flintstones: The First Episodes (1960: "The Flintstone Flyer", "Hot Lips Hannigan", "The Swimming Pool", "No Help Wanted"): Re-released January 26, 1989
 The Flintstones: Dripper (1966): contains the episode "Dripper": Released July 17, 1989
 The Flintstones Meet Rockula and Frankenstone (1980) with "The Flintstones' New Neighbors" as a bonus episode: Released September 1989
 The Flintstones: Masquerade Ball (1961): contains the episode "The Masquerade Ball": Released October 1989
 The Flintstones: How the Flintstones Saved Christmas (1964) contains the episode "Christmas Flintstone": Released November 9, 1989
 The Flintstones: Fred Flintstone Woos Again (1961): contains the episode "Fred Flintstone Woos Again": Released January 16, 1990
 The Flintstones: Dino & Juliet  (1964): contains the episode "Dino & Juliet": Released January 16, 1990
 The Flintstones and Friends in Wacky Wayfarers (1960–61: "Hollyrock, Here I Come", "The Long, Long Weekend"): Released June 14, 1990
 The Flintstones and Friends in Jet Set Fred! (1962–64: "The Rock Vegas Story", "El Terrifico"): Released June 14, 1990
 The Flintstones: Jealousy (1966): contains the episode "Jealousy": Released September 5, 1990
 The Flintstones: A Haunted House is Not a Home (1964): contains the episode "A Haunted House is Not a Home": Released October 4, 1990
 The Flintstone Comedy Show: Fred's Island (1966): contains the episode "Fred's Island": Released 1990
 The Flintstone Comedy Show: Boss for the Day (1966): contains the episode "Boss for a Day": Released 1990
 The Flintstones: Surfin' Fred (1965): contains the episode "Surfin' Fred": Released 1990
 The Flintstones 30th Anniversary Collection (1991):
 The Flintstones: A Page Right Out of History!: Released March 21, 1991
 Fred Flintstone's How to Draw!: Released March 21, 1991
 The Flintstones First Episodes (1960: "The Flintstone Flyer", "Hot Lips Hannigan", "The Swimming Pool", "No Help Wanted"): Released March 21, 1991
 The Flintstones Meet The Great Gazoo (1965): contains the episode "The Great Gazoo": Released March 21, 1991
 The Flintstones Meet Samantha (1965): contains the episode "Samantha": Released March 21, 1991
 The Man Called Flintstone (1966): Released March 21, 1991
 The Flintstone Flyer: The Very First Episode (1960): contains the episode "The Flintstone Flyer": Released July 11, 1991
 The Flintstones: 10 Little Flintstones (1964): contains the episode "10 Little Flintstones": Released July 11, 1991
 The Flintstones: Hop Happy (1964): contain the episode "Hop Happy": Released July 11, 1991
 The Flintstones: The Gravelberry Pie King (1966): contains the episode "The Gravelberry Pie King": Released July 11, 1991
 The Flintstone Files (1964–66: "The Gravelberry Pie King", "Hop Happy", "10 Little Flintstones"): Released July 11, 1991
 The Flintstones: No Biz Like Show Biz (1965): contains the episode "No Biz Like Show Biz": Released September 26, 1991
 The Flintstones: Wacky Inventions: Released April 27, 1994
 The Flintstones: Babe in Bedrock (1963: "Dress Rehearsal", "Daddy's Little Beauty"): Released April 27, 1994
 The Flintstones: Fearless Fred Strikes Again (1962–63: "The Buffalo Convention", "Mother-in-Law's Visit"): Released April 27, 1994
 The Flintstones: Hooray for Hollyrock (1963–65: "The Return of Stony Curtis", "Ann-Margrock Presents"): Released April 27, 1994
 The Flintstones: Dino's Two Tales (1962–63: "Dino Disappears", "Dino Goes Hollyrock"): Released September 14, 1994
 The Flintstones: Rocky Bye Babies (1963–64: "Little Bamm-Bamm", "The Most Beautiful Baby in Bedrock"): Released September 14, 1994
 The Flintstones: Bedrock 'N Roll (1961–62: "The Girls' Night Out", "The Twitch"): Released September 14, 1994
 The Flintstones: Fred Takes the Field (1961–63: "Flintstone of Prinstone", "Big League Freddie"): Released September 14, 1994
The Flintstones (1994 live-action film): Released November 8, 1994
 A Flintstones Christmas Carol (1994): Released September 26, 1995
 The Flintstones: A Haunted House is Not a Home (1964: "A Haunted House is Not a Home", "The Gruesomes"): Released September 10, 1996
 The Flintstones Christmas in Bedrock (1964 & 1993: Christmas Flintstone, A Flintstone Family Christmas): Released September 24, 1996
 The Flintstones: Love Letters on the Rocks (1961–64: "Love Letters on the Rocks", "Dino & Juliet"): Released January 14, 1997
 I Yabba-Dabba Do! (1993): Released January 14, 1997
 Pebbles & Bamm-Bamm: Watch Us Grow (1996: "Kiss and Spell", "Beanstalk Blues"): Released June 10, 1997
 Pebbles & Bamm-Bamm: At Play (1996: "Sand Castle Surprise", "Soap Bubble Dreams"): Released June 10, 1997
 Pebbles & Bamm-Bamm: Make New Friends (1996: "China Challenge", "Of Mice and Moon"): Released June 10, 1997
 The Flintstones: Stone-Age Adventures (1960–64: "The Flintstone Flyer", "The Split Personality", "The Twitch", "Dress Rehearsal", "Ladies Night at the Lodge", "Ann-Margrock Presents"): Released March 14, 2000
 The Flintstones in Viva Rock Vegas (2000 live-action prequel to 1994 film): Released March 6, 2001
Cartoon Crack-Ups by Cartoon Network (1960): contains the episode "The Swimming Pool": Released July 3, 2001

LaserDisc releases
 The Jetsons Meet the Flintstones (1987): Released September 1989
 Hanna-Barbera Personal Favorites: The Flintstones (1960–65: "The Split Personality", "The Blessed Event", "Ann-Margrock Presents", "The Stone-Finger Caper"): Released 1989
 The Flintstones Meet Rockula and Frankenstone (1980: "The Flintstones' New Neighbors" as a bonus episode): Released January 23, 1992
 The Man Called Flintstone (1966): Released January 30, 1992
 The Flintstones: The First 30 Years, Volume 1 (1960–66: "10 Little Flintstones", "The Gravelberry Pie King", "The Flintstone Flyer", "Hop Happy"): Released May 21, 1992
 The Flintstones Comedy Show, Volume 1 (1980: "Mountain Frustration", "Potion Problem", "Camp-Out Mouse", "Clownfoot", "The Ghost Sitters", "Sands of the Saharastone"): Released March 4, 1993
The Flintstones (1994 live-action film): Released November 8, 1994
 The Flintstones: First Fourteen Episodes Complete & Uncut (1960): Cartoon Network (along with John Kricfalusi) released a 4-disc LaserDisc set compiling the first 14 episodes of the series as they originally aired. Released February 19, 1997

DVD releases
Animated Series – Seasons Sets

Other DVD Releases

The Flintstones (1994 live-action film): Released March 16, 1999
The Flintstones in Viva Rock Vegas (2000 live-action film): Released September 26, 2000
Cartoon Crack-Ups (1960: "The Swimming Pool"): Released July 3, 2001
The Flintstone Flyer: The Very First Episode (1960): Released June 8, 2004
A Flintstones Christmas Carol (1994): Released October 2, 2007
The Pebbles and Bamm-Bamm Show: The Complete Series (1971–72): Released March 18, 2008
The Man Called Flintstone (1966): Released December 2, 2008
Saturday Morning Cartoons: 1980s (1986: "The Bad News Brontos", "Invasion of the Mommy Snatchers", "Dreamchip's Car Wash", "Princess Wilma"): Released May 4, 2010
The Jetsons Meet the Flintstones (1987): Released June 14, 2011
A Flintstone Christmas Collection (1977, 1993: A Flintstone Christmas, A Flintstone Family Christmas): Released September 27, 2011
4 Kid Favorites: The Flintstones Collection (1960: 14 episodes): Released March 13, 2012
I Yabba-Dabba Do! (1993): Released October 9, 2012 
Hollyrock-a-Bye Baby (1993): Released October 9, 2012 
The Flintstones Prime-Time Specials Collection: Volume 1 (1978–79: The Flintstones: Little Big League, The Flintstones Meet Rockula and Frankenstone): Released October 9, 2012   
The Flintstones Prime-Time Specials Collection: Volume 2 (1980–81: The Flintstones' New Neighbors, Fred's Final Fling, Wind-Up Wilma, Jogging Fever): Released October 9, 2012 
The Flintstone Kids: Rockin' in Bedrock (1986: 10 episodes): Released March 11, 2014
Fred Flintstone and Friends (1960: 7 episodes): Released May 6, 2014
The Flintstones & WWE: Stone Age SmackDown! (2015): Released March 10, 2015
Hanna-Barbera Diamond Collection:
The Flintstones: The Complete First Season (1960–61): Re-released May 23, 2017
The Pebbles and Bamm-Bamm Show: The Complete Series (1971–72): Re-released June 20, 2017
The Flintstones: The Complete Second Season (1961–62): Re-released October 3, 2017
The Flintstones: The Complete Third Season (1962–63): Re-released October 3, 2017
The Flintstones: The Complete Fourth Season (1963–64): Re-released October 3, 2017
The Flintstones: The Complete Fifth Season (1964–65): Re-released October 3, 2017
The Flintstones: The Complete Sixth Season (1965–66): Re-released October 3, 2017
Hanna-Barbera Diamond Collection 4-Pack (1960–61: The Flintstones: The Complete First Season): Released December 12, 2017
The Flintstones: The Complete Series (1960–66): Re-released February 13, 2018
Hanna-Barbera Holiday Triple Feature (1994: A Flintstones Christmas Carol): Released October 3, 2017
The Flintstones: 2 Movies and 5 Specials (1966–2015): Released August 4, 2020

Blu-ray releases
The Flintstones (1994 live-action film): Released August 19, 2014
The Flintstones & WWE: Stone Age SmackDown! (2015): Released March 10, 2015
The Flintstones in Viva Rock Vegas (2000 live-action film): Released June 4, 2019
The Flintstones: The Complete Series (1960–66): Released October 27, 2020 in identical sets in the US and France Episode 17 on disc one, "The Big Bank Robbery", was missing music and sound effects, and Warner issued a corrected disc.

Comics

Comic strips
 The Flintstones comic strip began October 2, 1961. Illustrated by Gene Hazelton and Roger Armstrong, and distributed by the McNaught Syndicate, it ran from 1961 to 1988. After McNaught went out of business, The Flintstones was picked up by Editors Press Service and drawn by Karen Machette until the late 1990s.

Comic books

 Western Publishing put out various titles of The Flintstones from 1961–70: 
The Flintstones by Dell Comics for 5 issues in 1961–62 and by Gold Key Comics for 54 issues in 1962–701
 The Flintstones Bigger and Boulder by Gold Key for 2 issues in 1962 and 19662
 Cave Kids by Gold Key for 16 issues in 1963–67, depicting adventures of kids set in the Flintstones' era (with issues featuring Pebbles & Bamm-Bamm)
 The Flintstones at the New York World's Fair through Warren Publishing in 1964
 The Flintstones Top Comics by Gold Key for 4 issues in 1967
 Permabooks did The Flintstones featuring Pebbles in 19633
 City Magazines published 1 issue of a digest-sized The Flintstones Mini-Comic in 19654
 Charlton Comics put out various Flintstones comics from 1970–77:
 The Flintstones and Pebbles for 50 issues in 1970–77
 Pebbles and Bamm Bamm for 36 issues in 1972–76
 Barney and Betty Rubble for 23 issues in 1973–76
 Dino for 20 issues in 1973–77
 The Great Gazoo for 20 issues in 1973–77
 Brown Watson published 1 annual  The Flintstones Annual in 1976
 Marvel Comics did 9 issues of Hanna-Barbera's The Flintstones in 1977–795
 The Flintstones Christmas Party issue #1 in 1977
 Marvel also published 11 issues of The Flintstone Kids, depicting the characters as children, under their Star Comics imprint from 1987–89
 Blackthorne Publishing put out 4 issues of The Flintstones 3-D in 1987–886 7
 Harvey Comics had several Flintstones titles that ran from 1992–94:
  The Flintstones for 13 issues in 1992–94
  The Flintstones Big Book for 2 issues in 1992–93
  The Flintstones Giant Size for 3 issues in 1992–93
  Pebbles and Bamm-Bamm for 3 issues in 1993–94
  The Flintstones Doublevision for 1 issue in 1994
 Archie Comics put out a title of The Flintstones for 22 issues in 1995–97
 DC Comics published a combo title of The Flintstones and the Jetsons for 21 issues from 1997–99
 DC published 12 issues of a more mature and satirical comic version of The Flintstones by Mark Russell and Steve Pugh in 2016–17

Notes:
1 The 5 Dell issues are numbered 2–6, the Flintstones first Dell appearance was in Dell Giants # 48, 1961. The 54 Gold Key issues are numbered 7–60
2 Both issues are identical, and a reprint of Gold Key's earlier series
3 The Flintstones featuring Pebbles is part comic and part paperback. It's the first appearance of Pebbles outside the TV series
4 The Flintstones Mini-Comic was a supplement to an issue of Huckleberry Hound Weekly
5 Marvel's Hanna Barbera's The Flintstones features the first non-underground comic-work of Scott Shaw!
6 The Flintstones 3-D were part of the Blackthorne 3-D series, issues 19, 22, 36 and 42
7 Issue 4 adapted the TV series episode that introduced Pebbles to comic books for the first time

Discography
The Flintstones: Original TV Soundtracks (1961, Colpix Records) [2 stories: The Snorkasaurus, The Bank Robbery]
Songs of The Flintstones (1961, Golden Records)
The Flintstones Flip Fables: Goldi Rocks and the Three Bearosauruses (1965, Hanna-Barbera Records)
Hansel & Gretel Starring The Flintstones (1965, Hanna-Barbera Records) []
Wilma Flintstone Tells the Story of Bambi (1965, Hanna-Barbera Records) []
On the Good Ship Lollipop Starring Pebbles & Bamm-Bamm (1965, Hanna-Barbera Records)
Pebbles & Bamm-Bamm Singing Songs of Christmas (1965, Hanna-Barbera Records)
The Flintstones and José Jiminez in the Time Machine (1966, Hanna-Barbera Records)
The Man Called Flintstone: Music from the Original Motion Picture Soundtrack (1966, Hanna-Barbera Records)
The Flintstones in S.A.S.F.A.T.P.O.G.O.B.S.Q.A.L.T. (1966, Hanna-Barbera Records)
Fred Flintstone & Barney Rubble in Songs from Mary Poppins (1966, Hanna-Barbera Records)
The Flintstones Meet The Orchestra Family (1968, Sunset Records) []
The Flintstones (1972, Peter Pan Records) [4 stories: Birthday Blues, The Great Shape-Up, Public Citizen No. 1, Ski-Doo]
The Flintstones (1975, Peter Pan Records) [2 stories: Ghost Chasers, Fred Flintstone Meets Weevil Primeval]
Fred Flintstone Presents All-Time Favorite Children's Stories and Songs  (1977, Columbia Records)
The Flintstones: A Christmas in Bedrock (1993, Kid Rhino)
The Flintstones Story (1994, Kid Rhino)
 The Flintstones Present Bedrock Hop: Hanna-Barbera Presents Funky Fred and The Bedrock Rappers (1994, Kid Rhino)
The Flintstones: Modern Stone-Age Melodies – Original Songs from the Classic TV Show Soundtrack (1994, Kid Rhino)
A Flintstones Motown Christmas (1996, Motown Records)
Pebbles & Bamm-Bamm: Cave Kids Sing-Along (1997, Kid Rhino)

Video games
Yabba Dabba Doo! (1986), by Quicksilva for Amstrad CPC, Commodore 64, ZX Spectrum
The Flintstones (1988), by Grandslam Entertainments for Amiga, Amstrad CPC, Atari ST, Commodore 64, Master System, MSX, ZX Spectrum  
The Flintstones: Dino: Lost in Bedrock (1990), by Hi Tech Expressions for DOS
The Flintstones: The Rescue of Dino & Hoppy (1991), by Taito for Nintendo Entertainment System
The Flintstones: King Rock Treasure Island (1993), by Taito for Game Boy
The Flintstones (1993), by Taito for the Mega Drive/Genesis
Flintstones/Jetsons: Time Warp (1994), by Philips Media for CD-i
Fred Flintstone's Memory Match (1994), by Coastal Amusements for video arcades
The Flintstones: The Surprise at Dinosaur Peak (1994), by Taito for Nintendo Entertainment System
The Flintstones: The Treasure of Sierra Madrock (1994), by Taito for Super Nintendo Entertainment System
The Flintstones (1994–95), by Ocean Software for Game Boy, Super Nintendo Entertainment System, Sega Channel
The Flintstones: Bedrock Bowling (2000), by SouthPeak Interative for PlayStation, Windows
The Flintstones: BurgerTime in Bedrock (2000), by Electro Source for Game Boy Color, a remake of BurgerTime
The Flintstones: Big Trouble in Bedrock (2001), by Conspiracy Entertainment for Game Boy Advance
The Flintstones in Viva Rock Vegas (2001), by Midas Interactive for PlayStation 2
The Flintstones: Bedrock Racing (2006), by Blast! Entertainment for PlayStation 2

References

Media
Flintstones